Shadowood is an unincorporated community in Clackamas County, Oregon, United States, about four miles south of Lake Oswego on the Tualatin River east of Shipley Bridge. Its elevation is 190 feet (58 m). Shadowood has a West Linn ZIP code.

The Shadowood area is a rural neighborhood comprising approximately 64 residences on both sides of a ravine formed by an unnamed creek and containing wetlands. The subdivision is served by a water system originally constructed in 1922 that started providing service in 1924.

The subdivision is named Shadow Wood Park and was originally a 1920s development of recreational retreats. The original residences were American Craftsman/Rustic-style log houses.

References

Unincorporated communities in Clackamas County, Oregon
1922 establishments in Oregon
Unincorporated communities in Oregon